This is a list of wars involving South Yemen.

References

 South Yemen
South Yemen
Wars
South Yemen